"I Shot an Arrow into the Air" is episode 15 of the American television anthology series The Twilight Zone.

Opening narration

Plot
A manned space flight with eight crew members crash lands on what the astronauts believe to be an unknown asteroid, with an area of desert and jagged mountains. Only four of the crew survive the crash: the commanding officer Donlin, crewmen Corey and Pierson, and a crewman named Hudak who is badly injured and barely alive, and the chances of rescue or survival are bleak. After they bury the dead men, Donlin and Pierson concern themselves with taking care of Hudak, but Corey, who is only concerned with saving himself, declares that sharing their limited supply of water with Hudak will reduce the chances of survival for the rest of them. This sets Corey at odds with both Pierson and Donlin, who insist that they will care for Hudak and share their water with him for as long as he does survive. Hudak dies a short time later; after they bury him, Donlin has Corey and Pierson trek out into the barren desert to see if there is anything that might improve their chances of survival.

Six hours later, Corey returns alone, claiming not to know where Pierson went. Donlin calls Corey out on having more water in his canteen now than he had when he left, and demands to know where Pierson is. Corey claims that he found Pierson dead and took his water. Not believing this account, Donlin wants to see for himself and forces Corey at gunpoint to lead him to Pierson's body. When they reach the spot Corey claims to have found Pierson, the body is not there, nor is there any evidence that backs Corey's claim, leaving Donlin more dubious. They later find Pierson near the edge of a mountain, alive but severely wounded. Donlin drops the gun and rushes to Pierson, who wordlessly gestures that he climbed the mountain and saw something. With his last bit of strength, Pierson draws a primitive diagram in the sand with his finger (two parallel lines intersected by a perpendicular line), and then dies. Meanwhile, Corey grabs the dropped gun, and confesses that he attacked Pierson earlier. He then shoots and kills Donlin and sets out alone, confident that he will survive longer now that he has all of the water for himself.

Corey climbs a mountain and sees a sign for Reno, along with telephone poles, which was what Pierson had attempted to draw before he died. Realizing that they had in fact never left Earth and that he had killed his partners for nothing, Corey breaks down weeping and begging his deceased crewmates for forgiveness.

Closing narration

Episode notes

Despite this, Serling did end up producing an idea from an industry outsider when he paid Madelon Champion $500 for the idea on which this episode was based, an idea that came up in a social conversation between the two.  Though Serling was frequently approached with suggestions for the series, such a purchase was never repeated.

Much of this episode was filmed in Death Valley National Monument (now a National Park), particularly around Zabriskie Point.
In addition to the usual opening and closing narration, this episode features a rare bit of narration from Serling in the middle of the show—after Corey kills Donlin, Serling narrates Corey's travels through the desert landscape. This was the last use of mid-show narration until season 3's "I Sing the Body Electric".
The title of the episode comes from the opening line of Henry Wadsworth Longfellow's "The Arrow and the Song": "I shot an arrow into the air, it fell to Earth I knew not where."  Serling also used this title for a prospective Twilight Zone pilot episode that was eventually shot, in modified form, as "The Gift".
The plot idea of astronauts thinking they had crashed on an unknown planet, only to discover that in fact they had been on Earth all along, would be adapted by Rod Serling in his work on the initial screenplay of the 1968 film Planet of the Apes.
This is one of several episodes from season one to have its opening title sequence replaced with the opening for season two. This was done during the summer of 1961 in order to match the re-running episodes of season one to episodes of the second season.

References

Further reading
 Full video of the episode at CBS.com
 DeVoe, Bill. (2008). Trivia from The Twilight Zone. Albany, GA: Bear Manor Media. 
 Grams, Martin. (2008). The Twilight Zone: Unlocking the Door to a Television Classic. Churchville, MD: OTR Publishing.

External links
 

1960 American television episodes
The Twilight Zone (1959 TV series season 1) episodes
Television episodes written by Rod Serling
Works about astronauts
Television shows based on short fiction
Television episodes set in Nevada